Choi Kyoung-hwan (born June 22, 1955) is a South Korean politician who was a member of the National Assembly of South Korea in the Hannara Party. He represented the Gyeongsan-Cheongdo region of Gyeongsangbuk-do.  Choi has promised to work for the extension of Daegu Subway Line 1 beyond the borders of Daegu to Gyeongsan, and to expand the Daegu Gyeongbuk Institute of Science and Technology. Choi was the acting Prime Minister from 27 April 2015 to 18 June 2015, following the departure of Lee Wan-koo.

Early life and education
Born in Gyeongsan's Sincheon-dong, Choi graduated from Daegu High School in 1975.  He obtained his bachelor's in economics at Yonsei University, passing the civil service exam while enrolled for a fourth year of study in 1979.  He later received his Ph.D. in economics at the University of Wisconsin–Madison, where he studied from 1987 to 1991.

Career
His work in economics has opened up various opportunities for Choi.  In 1995, he served as a researcher at the European Bank for Reconstruction and Development.  In the 2002 South Korean presidential election, he was special advisor on economics to then-presidential candidate Lee Hoi-chang.

In 2018 he was jailed for 5 years for bribery.

See also
Politics of South Korea

References

External links
Official campaign website, in Korean

1955 births
Deputy Prime Ministers of South Korea
Living people
Members of the National Assembly (South Korea)
People from North Gyeongsang Province
Finance ministers of South Korea
Liberty Korea Party politicians
University of Wisconsin–Madison alumni
South Korean politicians convicted of crimes
Heads of government who were later imprisoned
21st-century South Korean politicians
Yonsei University alumni